Dr. Shamoly Khera is a public speaker. 

Khera has been featured on UTV, Colors, Femina, MBC, Zee TV, IndianTelevision.com, MissMalini & Daily.

Career
Khera pursued acting and performing skills at Barry John Acting School in 2009. She acted in various theatre productions (for plays like Asylum, at Thespo 11 and Utter Cupidity) and later on several short films with Whistling Woods International till March 2011. She performed successful weekend shows of Utter Cupidity in July 2012 at The Comedy Store, as the opening act for The Vir Das Show. She joined UTV STARS during its inception and helped conceptualise, script and host episodes. Shows like Style Addict and Live My Life were acclaimed for their content and format.

Khera co-founded the production house One Take Media, with offices in Mumbai and Dubai. She manages international distribution and acquisition from the Dubai base. While in Dubai she hosted two seasons of Zee Connect airing on Zee TV Middle East.

She has hosted and produced a cooking show called The Great Indian Global Kitchen which aired on TLC India, Rishtey US, Rishtey UK, MBC Bollywood and British Airways.

Dr. Shamoly Khera has had a thriving career in the realm of interviews – from interviewing inspiring actoes like Amitabh Bacchan, Shahrukh Khan, Priyanka Chopra, Deepika Padukone, Ranveer Singh to leaders like Shashi Tharoor, Azad Moopen , Dr. Khera is a passionate interviewer and is known to write her own scripts and interview. From hosting TV shows in the genre of lifestyle, Bollywood & cooking to international on-ground events, Dr. Khera is known to bring a gust of energy and charisma to the screen with her wit and charm.

During the lockdown in 2020, Shamoly hosted her talk show called ‘Stay Home Stay Inspired.’ Some of the popular names on this show were Manav Kaul, Amit Gaur, Rajat Barmecha, Nitinn Miranni, Pankaj Mishra, Dr. Anjali Mukerjee, Malini Agarwal amongst others. The show received immense credibility to spread awareness & inspiration at times of crisis.

Shows

Writer

International hosting Representing India in Taiwan 
In 2019, Dr. Khera got an opportunity to represent India in Taiwan, via the show embracing Taiwan, produced by Zee International, where she got the opportunity to interview and interact with leading Taiwanese ministers & entrepreneurs like Joseph Wu, Minister of Foreign Affairs, Tseng Hou-jen, Diplomat and Theodore Huang amongst others.

AUTHOR 
Dr. Shamoly Khera's debut book Bedazzle –The Art & Science of Confidence was published by Bloomsbury India in December 2020 and has been trending in the bestseller self-help genre. The book focuses on building inner confidence; it offers practical insights and tips on speaking with confidence that can help anyone shine in their respective fields with charisma and ease. The book received a global launch in US, UK, India, Singapore and is available on Amazon worldwide.

Keynote Speaker 
Dr. Shamoly Khera is a Keynote Speaker at various conferences and expert meets. Her TED Talk was telecasted worldwide in October 2020. The talk focussed one living on the extraordinary life and the 5 essential things that can make it work.

References

External links 

Indian women television presenters
Indian television presenters
Living people
Year of birth missing (living people)